Environmental issue in Australia describes a number of environmental issues which affect the environment of Australia.  There are a range of such issues, some of the relating to conservation in Australia while others, for example the deteriorating state of Murray-Darling Basin, have a direct and serious effect on human land use and the economy.

Many human activities including the use of natural resources have a direct impact on the Australian environment.

These issues are the primary concern of the environmental movement in Australia.

Climate change 

Climate change is now a major political talking point in Australia in the last two decades. Persistent drought, and resulting water restrictions during the first decade of the twenty-first century, are an example of natural events' tangible effect on economic and political realities .

Australia ranks within the top ten countries globally with respect to greenhouse gas emissions per capital.

The current federal and state governments have all publicly stated their belief that climate change is being caused by anthropogenic greenhouse gas emissions. Vocal minority groups within the population campaign against mining and coal-fired power stations in Australia, and such demonstrations are widely reported by the mainstream media. Similarly, vocal minority groups concurrently oppose wind energy schemes, despite being 'carbon neutral', on the grounds of local visual and noise impact and concern for the currently high cost and low reliability of wind energy.

Despite the publication of the Garnaut report and the Green Paper on the proposed Carbon Pollution Reduction Scheme, public belief in anthropogenic climate change has noticeably eroded following the leaking of e-mails from the University of East Anglia's Climate Research Unit.

There is claimed to be a net benefit to Australia in stabilising greenhouse gases in the atmosphere at 450ppm CO2 eq in line with the prevailing political stance. Public disagreement with this opinion is generally dismissed as expression of vested interests, for example from the coal industry.

Energy use
Australia is a major exporter and consumer of coal, the combustion of which liberates CO2. Consequently, in 2003 Australia was the eighth highest emitter of CO2 gases per capita in the world liberating 16.5 tonnes per capital.
Australia is claimed to be one of the countries most at risk from climate change according to the Stern report.

Most of Australia's demand for electricity depends upon coal-fired thermal generation, owing to the plentiful indigenous coal supply, limited potential electric generation and political unwillingness to exploit indigenous uranium resources (although Australia accounted for the world's second highest production of uranium in 2005 to fuel a 'carbon neutral' domestic nuclear energy program.

Australia does not require its vehicles to meet any fuel efficiency standards, in spite of its emissions reduction target under the Paris Agreement.

Conservation

Conservation in Australia is an issue of state and federal policy. Australia is one of the most biologically diverse countries in the world, with a large portion of species endemic to Australia. Preserving this wealth of biodiversity is important for future generations.

A key conservation issue is the preservation of biodiversity, especially by protecting the remaining rainforests. The destruction of habitat by human activities, including land clearing, remains the major cause of biodiversity loss in Australia. The importance of the Australian rainforests to the conservation movement is very high. Australia is the only western country to have large areas of rainforest intact. Forests provide timber, drugs, and food and should be managed to maximize the possible uses. Currently, there are a number of environmental movements and campaigners advocating for action on saving the environment, one such campaign is the Big Switch.

Land management issues including clearance of native vegetation, reafforestation of once-cleared areas, control of exotic weeds and pests, expansion of dryland salinity, and changed fire regimes. Intensification of resource use in sectors such as forestry, fisheries, and agriculture are widely reported to contribute to biodiversity loss in Australia. Coastal and marine environments also have reduced biodiversity from reduced water quality caused by pollution and sediments arising from human settlements and agriculture. In central New South Wales where there are large plains of grassland, problems have risen from—unusual to say—lack of land clearing.

The Daintree Rainforest, a tropical rainforest near Daintree, Queensland covering around 1200 square kilometres, is threatened by logging, development, mining and the effects of the high tourist numbers.

There are some government programs in Australia which are the opposite of conservation (such as killing wildlife); an example of this is shark culling, which currently occurs in New South Wales and Queensland.

Native fauna

Over a hundred species of fauna are currently under serious threat of extinction.  The plight of some of these species receives more attention than others and recently the focus of many conservation organisations has been the critically endangered northern hairy-nosed wombat, the endangered Tasmanian devil, northern tiger quoll, south eastern red-tailed black cockatoo, southern cassowary, Tasmanian wedge-tailed eagle, Leadbeater's possum and southern corroboree frog.

Australia has a poor record of conservation of native fauna.  The extinction of Australian megafauna is attributed to the arrival of humans and since European settlement, 23 birds, 4 frogs, and 27 mammal species are also known to have become extinct.

Marine conservation

One of the notable issues with marine conservation in Australia is the protection of the Great Barrier Reef. The Great Barrier Reef's environmental pressures include water quality from runoff, climate change and mass coral bleaching, cyclic outbreaks of the crown-of-thorns starfish, overfishing, and shipping accidents. The government of Queensland currently kills sharks in the Great Barrier Reef using drum lines, causing damage to the marine ecosystem.

In 2021 Australia announced the creation of 2 national marine parks in size of 740,000 square kilometers. With those parks 45% of the Australian marine territory will be protected.

Whaling

Whaling in Australia took place from colonisation in 1788. In 1979 Australia terminated whaling and committed to whale protection. The main varieties hunted were humpback, blue, right and sperm whales.

Shark culling

Western Australia culled sharks in 2014, killing dozens of tiger sharks and causing public protest. Later that year it was abandoned, and the government of Western Australia continued to shoot and kill sharks it believed to be an "imminent threat" to humans from 2014 to 2017; this policy was criticized by senator Rachel Siewart for being environmentally damaging.

From 1962 to the present, the government of Queensland has killed sharks on drum lines and shark nets, a process that also kills other animals such as dolphins and dugongs. From 1962 to 2018, Queensland's "shark control" program killed roughly 50,000 sharks, including sharks in the Great Barrier Reef. Queensland's shark-killing program has been called "outdated, cruel and ineffective".

New South Wales has a shark net program that kills sharks as well as other marine life. Between 1950 and 2008, 352 tiger sharks and 577 great white sharks were killed in the nets in New South Wales – also during this period, a total of 15,135 marine animals were killed in the nets, including whales and turtles. There has been a very large decrease in the number of sharks in eastern Australia in recent years, and the shark-killing programs in Queensland and New South Wales are partly responsible for this decrease.

Jessica Morris of Humane Society International calls shark culling a "knee-jerk reaction" and says, "sharks are top order predators that play an important role in the functioning of marine ecosystems. We need them for healthy oceans."

Oil spills
While there have been no oil spill environmental disasters of the scale of the Exxon Valdez in the country, Australia has a large oil industry and there have been several large oil spills .  Spills remain a serious threat to the marine environment and Australian coastline.  The largest spill to date was the Kirki tanker in 1991 which dropped 17,280 tonnes of oil off the coast of Western Australia.

In March 2009, the 2009 southeast Queensland oil spill occurred, where 200,000 litres were spilled from the MV Pacific Adventurer spilling more than 250 tonnes of oil, 30 tonnes of fuel and other toxic chemicals on Brisbane's suburban beaches.  Premier Anna Bligh described the spill as "worst environmental disaster Queensland has ever seen".

Ocean dumping

A serious issue to the Australian marine environment is the dumping of rubbish from ships.  There have been a number of cases, particularly involving the navy of Australian and other countries polluting Australian waters including the dumping of chemical warfare agents. Recently documented cases include the aircraft carrier USS Ronald Reagan in 2006 which was found to be dumping rubbish off the shores of Moreton Island. In Victoria, a large number of toxic drums containing 1,2-Dichlorobenzene xylenol, a substance very toxic to aquatic creatures washed up on beaches during May 2009 presumably fallen off a passing container ship.

Invasive species 

Australia's geographical isolation has resulted in the evolution of many delicate ecological relationships that are sensitive to foreign invaders and in many instances provided no natural predators for many of the species subsequently introduced.  Introduced plants that have caused widespread problems are lantana and the prickly pear bush.  The introduction and spread of animals such as the cane toad or rabbit can disrupt the existing balances between populations and develop into environmental problems.  The introduction of cattle into Australia and to a lesser extent the dingo, are other examples of species that have changed the landscape. In some cases the introduction of new species can lead to plagues and the extinction of endemic species.

The introduced species red fox has single-handedly caused the extinction of several species.  Tasmania takes the threat of red fox introduction so seriously that it has a government sponsored taskforce to prevent fox populations from taking hold on the island.

Land degradation 

According to Jared Diamond, "Australia's number-one environmental problem [is] land degradation". Land degradation results from nine types of damaging environmental impacts:
 Clearance of native vegetation
 Overgrazing by sheep
 Rabbits
 Soil nutrient exhaustion
 Soil erosion
 Man-made droughts
 Weeds
 Misguided governmental policies
 Salinization

Logging and woodchopping 

Clearcutting of old growth forests is continuing in parts of Australia.   This often involves the destruction of natural ecosystems and the replacement with monoculture plantations.

Australia had a 2018 Forest Landscape Integrity Index mean score of 7.22/10, ranking it 46th globally out of 172 countries.

Land clearing 

In the prehistory of Australia the Indigenous Australians used fire-stick farming which was an early form of land clearing which caused long term changes to the ecology. With European colonisation land clearing continued on a larger scale for agriculture – particularly for cattle, cotton and wheat production. Since European settlement a total of 13% of native vegetation cover has been lost. The extinction of 20 different mammals, 9 bird and 97 plant species have been partially attributed to land clearing. Land clearing is a major source of Australia's greenhouse gas emissions, and contributed to approximately 12 percent of Australia's total emissions in 1998.

The consequences of land clearing include dryland salinity and soil erosion. These are a major concern to the landcare movement in Australia.

The clearing of native vegetation is controlled by Federal laws (indirectly), State law and local planning instruments. The precise details of regulation of vegetation clearing differ according to the location where clearing is proposed.

Soil salinity 

Soil salinity affects 50,000 km² of Australia and is predominantly due to land clearance.

Waterway health

The protection of waterways in Australia is a major concern for various reasons including habitat and biodiversity, but also due to use of the waterways by humans.

The Murray-Darling Basin is under threat due to irrigation in Australia, causing high levels of salinity which affect agriculture and biodiversity in New South Wales, Victoria and South Australia.  These rivers are also affected by pesticide run-off and drought.

Australian waterways facing environmental issues
Rivers and creeks in urban areas also face environmental issues, particularly pollution.

Victoria
 Port Phillip (contamination – silt; sediment; toxins; household chemicals; garden chemicals; E. coli; litter; flotsam and jetsam)
 Yarra River (contamination – E. coli; litter – 13 traps; logging; erosion; salinity)
 Maribyrnong River (contamination – arsenic and heavy metals; litter – 1 trap)
 Mullum Mullum Creek (contamination – E. coli; litter)
 Murray River (salinity, erosion)

New South Wales

 Parramatta River (contamination – dioxins, arsenic, coal tars, chromium, lead and phthalates)
 Darling River (salinity, erosion)
 Murray River (salinity, erosion)
 Cooks River (pollution, algal blooms)

Queensland
 Bremer River (water grading F – lowest possible)
 Brisbane River
 Oxley Creek (water grading D)
 Bulimba Creek (threatened species due to land degradation; pollution; litter)

South Australia
 River Torrens (contaminants – E. coli; algal bloom)

Water use

Water use is a major sustainability issue in Australia. Water is becoming a very very big problem for not only Australia but worldwide as where there are droughts occurring more often and only having limited use of the water and then there are even places that don't have any water at all such as India etc, we need conserve our water for the future and get more access to the water since we only have roughly 5% access to it.

Urbanisation

Australia is one of the most urbanised countries in the world.  Many Australian cities have large urban footprints and are characterised by an unsustainable low density urban sprawl.  This places demand on infrastructure and services which contributes to the problems of land clearing, pollution, transport related emissions, energy consumption, invasive species, automobile dependency and urban heat islands.

The urban sprawl continues to increase at a rapid rate in most Australian cities, particularly the state capital cities, all of which (with the exception of Hobart) are metropoleis.  In some centres, such as Sydney and Greater Western Sydney, Greater Melbourne and South East Queensland large metropolitan conurbations threaten to extend for hundreds of kilometres and based on current population growth rates are expected to become megacities in the 21st century.  Most Australian cities population growth is a result of migration in contrast to the Birth rate and fertility rate in Australia, which is contributing to the ongoing trend of urbanisation.

In recent years, some cities have implemented transit-oriented development strategies to curb the urban sprawl.  Notable examples include Melbourne 2030, South East Queensland Regional Plan and the Sydney Metropolitan Strategy. There are also population decentralisation programs at state and federal levels aimed at shifting populations out of the major centres and stemming the drivers to rapid urbanisation.  Albury-Wodonga was part of the federal government's program of decentralisation begun in the 1970s, which has at times had relocation policies for immigration.  The Victorian government has run a decentralisation program since the 1960s, having had a ministerial position appointed and ongoing promotional and investment programs for stimulating growth in Regional Victoria.  However policy has swung over the decades, primarily due to local development priorities and agendas and a lack of federal co-ordination to the problem.

Issues include large quantities of e-waste and toxic waste going into landfill.  Australia does not have restrictions on the dumping of toxic materials that are common in other countries, such as dumping Cathode Ray Tubes which leach heavy metals into water catchments.  Due to the lack of sufficient sites for toxic waste disposal large quantities of toxic waste are trucked between states to remote dumping grounds or exported overseas in ships.

Mining issues
Australia has the largest reserves of uranium in the world and there has been a number of enquiries on uranium mining. The anti-nuclear movement in Australia actively opposes mining and seeks to prevent the construction of nuclear power plants.

At least 150 leaks, spills and licence breaches occurred at the Ranger uranium mine between 1981 and 2009.

Controversial land use projects

The following is a list of development projects that have been controversial due to concerns of environmental effects.  This list includes projects required to submit an Environmental Effects Statement.

See also
 Conservation in Australia
 Flora of Australia
 Invasive species in Australia
 Land clearing in Australia
 List of environmental issues
 List of threatened flora of Australia
 Litter in Australia
 Recycling in Australia
 Timbarra Gold Mine – a highly controversial gold mine
 World Uranium Hearing

Notes and references

External links
 Australian Environment Portal
 Envirotalk – Australia's largest environmental discussion forum
 Environment Victoria